Thomas Joseph Healy (1854–1925) was an Irish solicitor and politician.

Born in Bantry, County Cork, he was the older brother of Tim Healy and Maurice Healy, both of whom, like him, became MPs for the Irish Parliamentary Party. He became a solicitor in 1888.

In a by-election in 1892, he was elected unopposed in a by-election in the constituency of North Wexford. He remained as member until the general election of 1900.

Endnotes

External links 

 

1854 births
1925 deaths
Irish Parliamentary Party MPs
Members of the Parliament of the United Kingdom for County Wexford constituencies (1801–1922)
People from Bantry
UK MPs 1886–1892
UK MPs 1892–1895
UK MPs 1895–1900
Anti-Parnellite MPs